Bodiniel is a group of small settlements in Cornwall, England, United Kingdom  north of Bodmin town centre. It is in the civil parish of Helland.

The settlements are three farmstead hamlets (Bodiniel, Middle Bodiniel, and Higher Bodiniel) on high ground overlooking the River Camel valley.

References

Hamlets in Cornwall